Keonjhar is a Lok Sabha parliamentary constituency in Odisha.

Assembly segments
Assembly Constituencies which constitute this Parliamentary Constituency, after delimitation of Parliamentary Constituencies and Legislative Assembly Constituencies of 2008 are:

Members of Parliament
2019: Chandrani Murmu, BJD
2014: Sakuntala Laguri, Biju Janata Dal
2009: Yashbant Narayan Singh Laguri, Biju Janata Dal
2004: Ananta Nayak, Bharatiya Janata Party
1999: Ananta Nayak, Bharatiya Janata Party
1998: Upendra Nath Nayak, Bharatiya Janata Party
1996: Madhab Sardar, Indian National Congress
1991: Govind Chandra Munda, Janata Dal
1989: Govind Chandra Munda, Janata Dal
1984: Harihar Soren, Indian National Congress
1980: Harihar Soren, Indian National Congress
1977: Govinda Munda, Janata Party
1971: Kumar Majhi, Indian National Congress
1967: Gurucharan Naik, Swatantra Party
1962: Laxmi Narayan Bhanja Deo, Indian National Congress
1957: Laxmi Narayan Bhanja Deo, Indian National Congress

Election Results

2019 
In 2019 election, Biju Janata Dal candidate Chandrani Murmu defeated Bharatiya Janata Party candidate Ananta Nayak by a margin of 66,192 votes.

2014 Election Results

General Election 2009

See also
 Kendujhar
 List of Constituencies of the Lok Sabha

References

Lok Sabha constituencies in Odisha
Kendujhar district
Mayurbhanj district